The Ethnographic Museum is located at 14 Ivan Mažuranić Square in Zagreb, Croatia. It was founded in 1919 by Salamon Berger. It lies in the Secession building of the one-time Trades Hall of 1903, designed by the architect Vjekoslav Bastl. The statues in the central part of the façade are  the work of Rudolf Valdec. The frescoes on the interior part of the cupola were painted by Oton Iveković.

The holdings of about 80,000 items cover the ethnographic heritage of Croatia, classified in three cultural zones: the Pannonian, Dinaric and Adriatic. Only about 2,800 items are on display. The exhibits richly illustrate the traditional way of life in Croatia, with a display of gold embroidered costumes and ceremonial dresses, music instruments, furniture, cooking utensils and tools. The reconstruction of farms and rooms gives an insight in the traditional life of farmers and fishermen. The Ljeposav Perinić collection consists of a number of dolls, dressed in traditional costumes. The museum features permanent exhibitions relating to life in Kosovo during the Ottoman era and focuses on a circle of life theme, with displays focusing on birth, life, death and heritage. Divided among two buildings, visitors will see rooms furnished just as they would have been during Ottoman times, as well as a traditional “room of birth” and “room of death.” Other rooms display traditional jewelry, costumes, pottery, weapons and other tools. Enthusiastic and knowledgeably English-speaking guides are available to walk you through the museum and share even more of the area's history and culture.

The museum also houses a large collection based on non-European cultures from Latin America, Central Africa, India, Melanesia, Polynesia and Australia.

References

External links
 
 Ethnographic Museum Zagreb at the Museum Documentation Centre 
 

Museums in Zagreb
1919 establishments in Croatia
Cultural infrastructure completed in 1903
Ethnographic museums in Europe
Museums established in 1919
Donji grad, Zagreb
Art Nouveau architecture in Zagreb
Art Nouveau commercial buildings
Art Nouveau museum buildings
Hönigsberg & Deutsch buildings